Carl Rose (born 25 November 1952) is a Canadian former soccer player who competed at the 1976 Summer Olympics.  He also was a member of the Canadian squad at the 1975 Pan American Games.

References

External links
MISL stats

1952 births
Living people
Footballers from Greater London
English emigrants to Canada
Naturalized citizens of Canada
Canadian soccer players
Canadian expatriate soccer players
Olympic soccer players of Canada
Footballers at the 1976 Summer Olympics
Pan American Games competitors for Canada
Footballers at the 1975 Pan American Games
Major Indoor Soccer League (1978–1992) players
New York Arrows players
St. Louis Steamers (original MISL) players
Canadian expatriate sportspeople in the United States
Expatriate soccer players in the United States
Black Canadian soccer players
Association football defenders
Black British sportspeople